Up Close and Personal Tour was a 2012 North American and European concert tour by hard rock band Guns N' Roses.

Background
On January 20, guitarist Bumblefoot talked about a possible theater tour taking place in February. Guns N' Roses later announced shows in United States.

The shows themselves varied considerably in comparison to the Chinese Democracy Tour. All of the North American shows took place in smaller-scale clubs, rather than a large arena or stadium. All pyrotechnics were removed from the shows.

The European leg of the tour began approximately one month after the band's induction into the Rock and Roll Hall of Fame. The circumstance regarding a new album were unknown, however lead guitarist DJ Ashba stated that the band had many demos recorded, and were planning on discussing 'how they are going to create the best album possible.' 

On June 24, guitarist Richard Fortus gave an interview to the French music site, Rock N' Live, in which he revealed that the band would not tour more that year, but would rather go into the studio to work on the next album by the end of the year. "Right now I'm very focused on Guns N' Roses. We are preparing ourselves to return to the studio, so that is why I want to stay focused. That's all that I think by the end of the year."

Line up
The band line-up remained approximately the same since the 2008 release of Chinese Democracy. Co-founder Axl Rose fronted the band, which also included long-term keyboardists Dizzy Reed and Chris Pitman. Newcomer DJ Ashba and Ron "Bumblefoot" Thal were lead guitarists, while the rhythm section consisted of Richard Fortus on rhythm guitar, Tommy Stinson on bass and drummer Frank Ferrer.

Support acts

Dick Manitoba (February 10)
Chelsea Smiles (February 12)
Toilet Böys (February 15)
Electric Sun (February 19 / February 23)
Sponge (February 21)
The Last Vegas (February 24 / February 27)
Fall of Envy (March 3)
Bob Lee Rodgers (March 5)
Falling In Reverse (March 9)

Goldsboro (March 11 / March 12)
Thin Lizzy (May 17 – June 1)
Vengeance and The Panther Queen (May 17)
Black Spiders (May 19)
Rival Sons (June 8 / June 22)
Within Temptation (June 22)
Sebastian Bach (June 22)
Killswitch Engage (June 22)

Black Stone Cherry (June 22)
Soulfly (June 22)
Ugly Kid Joe (May 22 / July 3)
AxeWound (June 22)
Cancer Bats (June 22)
No One is Innocent (June 10–19)
The Cult  (June 29)
The Darkness  (July 22)

Tour dates

Festivals and other miscellaneous performances
This concert was a part of "Hellfest"
This concert was a part of "Gods of Metal"
This concert was a part of "Graspop Metal Meeting"
This concert was a part of "Seerock Festival"
This concert was a part of "Tuborg GreenFest"
This concert was a part of "Unirock Open Air Festival"
This concert was a part of "Sofia Rocks"
This concert was a part of "Topfest"
This concert was a part of "Exit Festival"
This concert was a part of "Festival Internacional de Benicàssim"

Box office score data

Personnel
Axl Rose – lead vocals, piano, tambourine
Dizzy Reed – keyboards, piano, percussion, backing vocals
Tommy Stinson – bass, backing vocals, lead vocals
DJ Ashba – lead guitar, rhythm guitar, snare drum
Ron "Bumblefoot" Thal – lead guitar, rhythm guitar, acoustic guitar, backing vocals
Richard Fortus – rhythm guitar, lead guitar, slide guitar, acoustic guitar, backing vocals
Chris Pitman – keyboards, synthesizer, samples, tambourine, backing vocals
Frank Ferrer – drums, tambourine

References

Guns N' Roses concert tours
2012 concert tours